The church of St. Andreas is the principal Lutheran church of Hildesheim, Germany, not to be confounded with the Catholic Hildesheim Cathedral.

History
The earliest church building on the Treibeinsel dedicated to the Apostle Andreas (Andrew) was a simple pre-Romanesque chapel, which already existed at the death of Bishop Bernward in 1022. Bishop Godehard was brought here after his death in 1038 so the people could mourn.

During the romanesque period, the center of the market and workshops was relocated from the swampy lowlands between Domburg and Michaeliskirche ("Old Market") to near St. Andreas. The chapel was subsequently replaced with a romanesque church with a strong westwork.

The building of the gothic church, in the basilica style and romanesque westwork, was begun at the end of the fourteenth century, the choir in 1389, the northern nave in 1404, and the tower in 1503. By 1504, the nave with its side altars was finished and all that remained to be completed was the tower. This was only done in 1883-1890, when the tower reached its current height. The interior, with the quire and the radiating side chapels to the east, was modeled after the French cathedrals.

Like market churches in many other German dioceses, St. Andreas represented bourgeois self-confidence in the High Middle Ages in comparison to the lordship of the Bishops, manifested in the cathedral. During the Reformation, this old question of authority was combined with the religious question. Consequently, in 1542, St. Andreas became the first church in Hildesheim to support Lutheranism; it was also there where Johannes Bugenhagen initiated the new church order. This is remembered in the 1995 Brunnen Memorial by Ulrich Henn, which is located in the southern forecourt of the church.

The church burned down during the Second World War on 22 March 1945, and only the ruined outer wall remained standing. The church had already been damaged on 22 February and 3 March 1945. From 1956-1965, St. Andreas was completely rebuilt as an almost exact copy of the original. Opposite the church, the Upended Sugarloaf, a famous half timbered-house with a very unusual shape, was rebuilt in 2009/2010.

Bells

In the tower hang four bells from 1725, 1738, 1632, and 1963:

Measurements
The church's dimensions attest to the prosperity and self-confidence of the Hildesheim citizens. St. Andreas is with its 114.5 m tower one of the tallest churches of the world.

Length: 80 m 
Width: 35 m 
Height: 27 m 
Tower: 114.5 m

See also
 List of tallest structures built before the 20th century

References
The information in this article is based on that in its German equivalent.

External links

 St.-Andreas-Gemeinde Hildesheim Official website of the parish

Hildesheim Andreas
Hildesheim Andreas
Hildesheim Andreas
Hildesheim Andreas
Andreas
Hildesheim Andreas
Hildesheim Andreas